Benjamin Riley (1866 – 6 January 1946) was a British Labour Party politician.

Born in Halifax, Riley was the son of a stonemason. He started work aged 9, and was apprenticed to the bookbinding trade. He served as a journeyman in Bath, Brighton and London, eventually starting his own business in Huddersfield in 1896. At the same time he was employed as a lecturer by the Land Restoration League, visiting agricultural labourers in various counties. He married Lucy Rushworth of Halifax, and they had one son.

Riley was a founding member of the Independent Labour Party, and was elected to Huddersfield School Board in 1896 and to Huddersfield Town Council in 1904.

At the 1918 general election Riley stood as the Labour Party's candidate in the Dewsbury constituency, but failed to be elected. At the next election in 1922 Riley won the seat, but lost it the following year. In 1924 he regained the seat. He was Parliamentary Private Secretary to Noel Buxton, Minister of Agriculture, Fisheries and Food in the Labour Government of 1929-1931. At the 1931 general election he lost his seat, along with many other Labour Party MPs.

Riley returned to the Commons at the 1935 general election. He held the seat until the 1945 general election, when he retired.

He died at his home in Huddersfield in January 1946, aged 80.

References

External links 
 

1866 births
1946 deaths
UK MPs 1922–1923
Independent Labour Party National Administrative Committee members
Labour Party (UK) MPs for English constituencies
UK MPs 1924–1929
UK MPs 1929–1931
UK MPs 1935–1945
People from Halifax, West Yorkshire
People from Huddersfield